Westland was a parliamentary electorate in the West Coast of New Zealand from 1866 to 1868 and 1890 to 1972. In 1972 the Tasman and West Coast electorates replaced the former Buller and Westland electorates.

Population centres
In the 1865 electoral redistribution, the House of Representatives focussed its review of electorates to South Island electorates only, as the Central Otago Gold Rush had caused significant population growth, and a redistribution of the existing population. Fifteen additional South Island electorates were created, including Westland, and the number of Members of Parliament was increased by 13 to 70.

In December 1887, the House of Representatives voted to reduce its membership from general electorates from 91 to 70. The 1890 electoral redistribution used the same 1886 census data used for the 1887 electoral redistribution. In addition, three-member electorates were introduced in the four main centres. This resulted in a major restructuring of electorates, and Westland was one of eight electorates to be re-created for the 1890 election.

History
William Sefton Moorhouse stood in the electorate and was returned 16 March 1866 in favour of William Shaw.

The general election was held on 22 February 1866 in the Mount Herbert electorate, in which Moorhouse was returned unopposed. Having been elected in two electorates, Moorhouse chose to represent Westland. Moorhouse resigned on 20 February 1868.

Joseph Grimmond, who had since 1887 represented the Hokitika electorate, contested the Westland electorate in the 1890 general election against Richard Seddon, with Seddon being successful. Seddon held the electorate until his death in 1906.

Members of Parliament

The electorate was represented by seven Members of Parliament:

Key

Election results

1969 election

1966 election

1963 election

1960 election

1957 election

1954 election

1951 election

1949 election

1947 by-election

1946 election

1931 election

1928 election

1925 election

1922 election

1919 election

1906 by-election

1905 election

1902 election

1899 election

1896 election

1893 election

1890 election

1866 election

Notes

References

Historical electorates of New Zealand
1865 establishments in New Zealand
1890 establishments in New Zealand
1868 disestablishments in New Zealand
1972 disestablishments in New Zealand
Politics of the West Coast, New Zealand